Heredia railway station is a staffed train station, managed by Incofer, located in the Heredia province of Costa Rica

Station layout

Two tracks at ground level with platforms on both sides.

History

The station building was built in the 1870s with :es:bahareque and structurally improved in 1905 by adding wood panels, it was used for freight and passenger transportation, and fell to disrepair in the middle of the 20th century.  In 1992 the passenger service from the station towards San José was reestablished, which then in 1995 was stopped due to the closure of Incofer, and reopened for service again in 2009.  

The station received a major restoration effort between 2018 and 2019, financed by the local government, the Heredia municipality, at a cost of CRC ₡348 million, and designed by architects from the Costa Rica Institute of Technology.  The station was reopened on July 5, 2019.  

It is an historical patrimony building of Costa Rica since 2003.

Around the station

To the north of the station is the Mercado Florense, and nearby is the Mercado Municipal de Heredia.

Adjacent stations

Bus stops towards other areas of Heredia province.

See also 
 Atlántico railway station
 Rail transport in Costa Rica
 Interurbano Line

References

Rail transport in Costa Rica